The Czech Republic women's national 3x3 team is the 3x3 basketball team representing the Czech Republic in international women's competitions, organized and run by the Czech Basketball Federation.

Competitions

Summer Olympics

3x3 World Cup

See also
Czech Republic women's national basketball team
Czech Republic men's national 3x3 team

References

External links
 

Czech Republic women's national basketball team
Women's national 3x3 basketball teams